Ambarish Ghosh is an Indian scientist, a faculty member at the Centre for Nano Science and Engineering (CeNSE), Indian Institute of Science, Bangalore. He is also an associate faculty at the Department of Physics. He is known for his work on nanorobots, active matter physics, plasmonics, metamaterials and electron bubbles in liquid helium.

Research work

Magnetic nanorobots
In 2009, he along with Peer Fischer demonstrated the use of glancing-angle deposition to fabricate magnetic helical nanorobots. His group worked out the theoretical formulae to describe the dynamics of such nanorobots and presented techniques for their independent control.

In recent years his group has managed to demonstrate various applications of helical nanorobots including techniques to move in important biological environments, such as blood. and as probes for sensing the environment inside living cells.

Plasmonics and Metamaterials
Ambarish Ghosh and his group demonstrated a wafer scale technology to fabricate porous 3D plasmonic metamaterials which can be used over a wide range of wavelengths, including the visible. These metal-dielectric nanostructured films can be made in various geometries and configurations. Very recently, they have demonstrated a novel technique to integrate plasmonic nanoparticles with graphene in a sandwich configuration, allowing them to achieve unprecedented electromagnetic field enhancement and photodetection sensitivity. In 2019, his group showed the application of metal-dielectric hybrid nanorods in active opto-fluidic manipulation of sub-micron colloids.

Electron bubbles in Liquid Helium
The group led by Ambarish Ghosh demonstrated trapping of multielectron bubbles in liquid helium-4, which can open up new avenues in the study of two-dimensional electron systems at high densities, and on curved surfaces. The same group also performed high speed imaging of the "explosion" of an electron bubbles triggered by focused ultrasound.

Recognition 
Ambarish received the Young Career Award in Nano Science and Technology for 2017 from DST Nanomission, India. The Council of Scientific and Industrial Research, the apex agency of the Government of India for scientific research, awarded him the Shanti Swarup Bhatnagar Prize for Science and Technology for his contributions to physical sciences in 2018. He received the Prof. Ramakrishna Rao Chair Professorship from 2017–2020. He was elected as Fellow of INAE (Indian National Academy of Engineering) in 2020.

References 

Recipients of the Shanti Swarup Bhatnagar Award in Physical Science
Scientists from West Bengal
Indian physicists
Bengali physicists
Bengali scientists
Academic staff of the Indian Institute of Science
Living people
People from Kolkata
IIT Kharagpur alumni
Brown University alumni
1973 births